Sonja Lee Macfarlane  is a New Zealand education academic and an associate professor at the University of Canterbury. Macfarlane specialises in the development of cultural awareness in the New Zealand education system.

Academic career 

After a PhD titled In Pursuit of Culturally Responsive Evidence Based Special Education Pathways in Aotearoa New Zealand: Whaia ki te ara tika at the University of Canterbury completed in 2012, Macfarlane moved to Te Kura o te Mātauranga Institute of Education at Massey University, and then to the University of Canterbury, rising to associate professor.

Awards 
In 2021 Macfarlane was elected as a Fellow of the Royal Society Te Apārangi. Her nomination said "Sonja has played a key role in the advancement of alternative ways for educators and psychologists to improve cultural awareness and responsivity, leading to the implementation of practices that accrue benefits for Māori learners (education) and clients (psychology). Her culturally-grounded publications and applied practice models in these disciplines have established her as an authority on the ways professionals can engage authentically within their professional spaces."

Personal life 
Macfarlane is affiliated with Ngāi Tahu and Ngāti Waewae iwi. Her husband Angus Hikairo Macfarlane is professor of Māori research at the University of Canterbury.

Selected works

References

External links 

 Haegenga o te kitenga (Macfarlane's new fellows seminar at the Royal Society Te Apārangi)
 University profile

New Zealand academics
New Zealand women academics
Academic staff of the University of Canterbury
University of Canterbury alumni
Ngāi Tahu people
Rereahu people
Fellows of the Royal Society of New Zealand
Year of birth missing (living people)